Scomberoidinae is a subfamily of ray-finned fish from the family Carangidae which consists of three genera and 10 species. The species in this subfamily have been given the common names leatherjacket and queenfish.

Genera
The following genera are classified within the Scomberoidinae:

 Genus Oligoplites Gill, 1863
 Genus Parona C. Berg, 1895
 Genus Scomberoides Lacépède, 1801

References

 
Carangidae
Fish subfamilies